Regina Bianchi (1 January 1921 – 5 April 2013) was an Italian stage and film actress.

Life and career
Born in Lecce as Regina D'Antigny, she was the daughter of two theater actors. Forced by the fascist phobia of foreign cultures to change her surname, she adopted the surname of her paternal grandmother.

At age 16, she entered the stage company of Raffaele Viviani and, that year, debuted in the comedy play Campagna napoletana, in the leading role of Reginella. In 1939, she starred in the drama film Il ponte di vetro; on the film set she became engaged to the director Goffredo Alessandrini, who remained her partner for over 20 years.

After having announced her retirement in 1944, she came back in 1959 with the title role in Eduardo De Filippo's Filumena Marturano. She won two Nastro d'Argento for Best Supporting Actress, in 1963 for Nanni Loy's The Four Days of Naples, and in 1996 for Leone Pompucci's Camerieri, and she appeared as Anna, the mother of Mary, in Franco Zeffirelli's television  miniseries Jesus of Nazareth in 1977.

In 1996, she was awarded Grand Officer of the Italian Republic for artistic merits. She died at 92 in her home in Rome.

Filmography
{| class="wikitable"
|-
! Year
! Title
! Role
! Notes
|-
|1939|| Rosa de Sangue ' || ||
|-
|1939|| The Silent Partner || ||
|-
|1940|| Bridge of Glass || Anna ||
|-
|1940|| Then We'll Get a Divorce || Margaret ||
|-
|1940|| Then We'll Get a Divorce || Margaret ||
|-
|1942|| I due Foscari || Lucrezia Contarini ||
|-
|1961|| The Last Judgment || ||
|-
|1961|| A Day for Lionhearts || Moglie di Edoardo ||
|-
|1962|| His Days Are Numbered || Giulia ||
|-
|1962|| A Milanese Story || Madre di Valeria ||
|-
|1962|| The Four Days of Naples || Concetta Capuozzo || Uncredited
|-
|1966|| Shoot Loud, Louder... I Don't Understand || Rosa Amitrano ||
|-
|1966|| Il nero || ||
|-
|1968|| Operazione ricchezza || ||
|-
|1969|| Temptation || ||
|-
|1977|| Jesus of Nazareth || Anna || 1 episode
|-
|1977|| Dove volano i corvi d'argento || Istevene's mother ||
|-
|1980|| Zappatore || Maddalena Esposito ||
|-
|1981|| Carcerato || Donna Assunta ||
|-
|1981|| Celebrità || Rosa ||
|-
|1982|| Giuramento || Sua madre ||
|-
|1983|| Stangata napoletana || Palmira ||
|-
|1984|| Kaos || Madre di Pirandello || (segment "Colloquio con la madre")
|-
|1985|| L'amara scienza || ||
|-
|1994|| Law of Courage || Mrs. Livatino ||
|-
|1994|| The Teddy Bear || Nonna Claudia ||
|-
|1995|| Camerieri || Salvatore Azzaro's Wife ||
|-
|1999|| Il manoscritto di Van Hecken || ||
|-
|1999|| Not registered || Tonia ||
|-
|2001|| E adesso sesso || Nonna Assunta ||
|-
|2002|| Sotto gli occhi di tutti || Tonia ||
|-
|2008|| Ci sta un francese, un inglese e un napoletano || Madre Noemi || (final film role)
|}

 References 

Further reading
 Barbara Bulzomì, Regina Bianchi. Regina del palcoscenico, Edizioni Universitarie Romane, 2008; 
 Maricla Boggio, Vita di Regina. Regina Bianchi si racconta'', RAI-ERI, 2012;

External links
 

Italian film actresses
1921 births
People from Lecce
Italian stage actresses
20th-century Italian actresses
Nastro d'Argento winners
2013 deaths
Grand Officers of the Order of Merit of the Italian Republic